James Seton may refer to:

Sir James Seton (died 1606), commissioner to the Parliament of Scotland in 1593 and 1596, represented Dumbartonshire (UK Parliament constituency)
James Seton (died 1673), commissioner for Stirlingshire between 1665 and 1672
James Seton (died 1702), commissioner for Stirlingshire between 1673 and 1686
James Seton, 4th Earl of Dunfermline (died 1694), Scottish peer
 James Alexander Seton (1816–1845), last British person to be killed in a duel on English soil

See also
James Seaton (disambiguation)